Thomas Lonie (26 November 1874 – 1941) was a Scottish footballer who played in the Football League for Darwen, Leicester Fosse and Stoke.

Career
Lonie was born in Dundee and played for local sides Dundee Harp and Johnstone Wanderers before moving to England with Notts County. He failed to get a match at County and left for Darwen before moving back to Dundee. Stoke brought him back down south and he scored four goals in nine matches during the 1895–96 season. He left at the end of the season to play for Leicester Fosse.

Career statistics
Source:

References

Scottish footballers
Dundee Wanderers F.C. players
Dundee Harp F.C. players
Stoke City F.C. players
Darwen F.C. players
Dundee F.C. players
Leicester City F.C. players
English Football League players
1874 births
1941 deaths
Association football forwards